Park Jae-yong may refer to:
 Park Jae-yong (footballer)
 Park Jae-yong (handballer)